Jesper Johansson (born July 6, 1993) is a Swedish ice hockey player.

Johansson made his Elitserien debut playing with Skellefteå AIK during the 2012–13 Elitserien season.

References

External links

1993 births
Living people
Swedish ice hockey forwards
Skellefteå AIK players
People from Skellefteå Municipality
Sportspeople from Västerbotten County